Marktgraitz is a municipality in the district of Lichtenfels in Bavaria in Germany.

References

Lichtenfels (district)